Sheridan is a ghost town in Wheeler County, Nebraska, United States.

History
A post office was established at Sheridan in 1913, and remained in operation until it was discontinued in 1935. The town was named for Philip Sheridan, a Union general during the Civil War.

References

Geography of Wheeler County, Nebraska